The Fort Smith to Jackson Road-Talbert's Ferry Segments are a section of an historic 19th century road in central western Baxter County, Arkansas. They are surviving elements of a road built in the 1830s which connected Fort Smith with Jackson County. It was one of the first roads to be built through north central Arkansas, and these segments, located near a crossing of the White River, are documented to have been used by parties removing Native Americans during the Trail of Tears in the 1830s.

See also
National Register of Historic Places listings in Baxter County, Arkansas

References

Archaeological sites on the National Register of Historic Places in Arkansas
Baxter County, Arkansas
Trail of Tears
National Register of Historic Places in Baxter County, Arkansas